Explicit Game is the second studio album by American rapper Dru Down, his first for Relativity Records, and his first to make the billboard charts. Essentially a re-release of his 1993 debut album, Fools from the Streets, the album features similar cover art, a re-ordered track list, and a few new tracks. Explicit Game made it to 46 on the Top R&B/Hip-Hop Albums chart and 31 on the Top Heatseekers chart. In addition to the album charting, a single entitled "Pimp of the Year" made it to 65 on the Billboard Top 100 and 10 on the Hot Rap Tracks.

Track listing
"Pimp of the Year" – 4:14
"Ice Cream Man" (featuring Luniz) – 5:18
"Rescue 911" (featuring Yukmouth) – 6:37
"Realer Than Real" – 4:29
"Rigged" (featuring Luniz) – 4:21
"Bad Boys" (featuring JT the Bigga Figga) – 5:40
"Should Have Said So" – 6:13
"Talkin' Shit" – 4:45
"Ain't No Stoppin'" – 3:40
"Hoo Ride" (featuring Luniz) – 4:54
"Call Me Dru Down" – 3:38
"No One Loves You" (featuring Yukmouth) – 4:00
"Talk How You Feel" (featuring Numskull) – 3:45
"Fools from the Streets" (featuring Luniz) – 5:11
"Bonus Track" (featuring Luniz) – 4:38

Charts

References 

1994 albums
Dru Down albums
Relativity Records albums
Albums produced by Ant Banks
Gangsta rap albums by American artists